Sailing (as Yachting) was contested at the 1982 Asian Games at the Arabian Sea near Mumbai, India from 21 November to 27 November.

OK Dinghy, Enterprise, Fireball and Windglider classes were held in the competition.

Medalists

Medal table

References

External links 
 Olympic Council of Asia

 
1982 Asian Games events
1982
Asian Games
Sailing competitions in India